The Go-Between is a 1971 British period romantic drama film directed by Joseph Losey.  Its screenplay, by Harold Pinter, is an adaptation of the 1953 novel The Go-Between by L. P. Hartley. The film stars Julie Christie, Alan Bates, Margaret Leighton, Michael Redgrave and Dominic Guard. It won the Palme d'Or at the 1971 Cannes Film Festival.

Plot
The story follows a young boy named Leo Colston, who in the year 1900 is a guest of his wealthy school friend, Marcus Maudsley, to spend the summer holidays at his family's Norfolk country house.  While there, Marcus is taken sick and quarantined with the measles. Left to entertain himself, Leo befriends Marcus's beautiful elder sister Marian Maudsley, and finds himself a messenger, carrying messages between her and a tenant farmer neighbour, Ted Burgess, with whom she is engaging in a secret illicit affair.

Marian's parents, however, want her to marry Hugh, Viscount Trimingham, the estate owner, who is also courting Marian. A heatwave leading to a thunderstorm coincides with Leo's thirteenth birthday party and the film's climax, when Marian's mother Madeleine forces Leo to take her to Marian, and they find her making love to Burgess in a farm building. This event has a long-lasting impact on Leo after Burgess shoots himself dead in his farmhouse kitchen.

More than fifty years later, Marian, now the Dowager Lady Trimingham, sends for Leo, wanting him to speak to her grandson to assure him that she did truly love Burgess. She asks Leo whether her grandson reminds him of anyone, and he replies "Yes. Ted Burgess".

Main cast

Production

Development
The rights to the novel had been in the hands of many producers, including Anthony Asquith. Then Sir Alexander Korda purchased it in 1956. He originally envisaged Alec Guinness and Margaret Leighton in the leads and employed Nancy Mitford to write a script. Hartley later said Korda had no real intention to make a film of the book – he kept the rights hoping to re-sell them at a profit. Hartley says "I was so annoyed when I heard of this that I put a curse on him and he died, almost the next morning."

Joseph Losey was interested in filming the novel. He tried to get financing for a version in 1963 after filming The Servant and said Pinter had written "two-thirds of a script, but could not  find the money to make the film, either then or at a second attempt in 1968.

"The company had cold feet about the story", said Losey. "It was too tame for the pornographic age. As one man put it, who would be interested in a bit of Edwardian nostalgia? That's idiotic. It is certainly not a romantic or sentimental piece. It has a surface and a coating of romantic melodrama, but it has a bitter core."

Losey said he was attracted to the novel because it was about "the terrible sense of shortness of any human life, the sense of totality of life."

Pinter's screenplay for the film was his final collaboration with Losey, following The Servant (1963), Modesty Blaise (1966) and Accident (1967). It is largely faithful to the novel, although it alludes to the novel's opening events in dialogue, in which Leo is admired by other boys at his school as they believe he used black magic to punish two bullies, and also moves events described in the novel's epilogue into the central narrative.

Losey later said he was glad he and Pinter did not make the film until after Accident because that film encouraged them to play around with time in storytelling.

Finance
Eventually John Heyman managed to get financing from EMI Films, where Bryan Forbes agreed to pay £75,000 for the script.

Because of the relatively steep budget, EMI had to seek co-production financing from MGM. Losey budgeted the film for $2.4 million but had to make it for $1.2 million; he did this by cutting the shooting schedule by a month and working for a percentage of the profits instead of a fee.

In July 1970 MGM-EMI announced they would make the film as part of four co-productions, the others being Get Carter, The Boyfriend and The Last Run directed by John Boorman. Of these only the last was not made.

Shooting
Filming started in August 1970. The film was shot at Melton Constable Hall, Heydon and Norwich in Norfolk. Filming wound up in November.

Pinter was on set during filming. Losey said the making of the film was one of the happiest in his career. Dominic Guard struggled with a stammer that would make delivering his lines impossible at times, and which caused him to develop nervous tics. Losey dealt with this by coaching Guard and telling him he had faith in him, but also in "a rather brutal way" by jumping in and telling him to stop whenever Guard was betraying a tic or stammer.

Music
Richard Rodney Bennett was originally announced as the composer. However Michel Legrand ended up doing the soundtrack for the film. The main theme was later used as the title music for the French "true crime" documentary series Faites entrer l'accusé (in French Wikipedia). The love theme "I Still See You" written by Legrand with lyrics by Hal Sharper was performed by Scott Walker and released as a single in late 1971.

Release
The film was first shown in May 1971 at the Cannes Film Festival, where it won the Grand Prix International du Festival. A few days before, James Aubrey, head of MGM, disliked the final film and regarded it a flop.

The film was released in the UK on 24 September 1971, opening at ABC1 on Shaftesbury Avenue in London. A month later, on 29 October, Queen Elizabeth, the Queen Mother arrived at the ABC Cinema on Prince of Wales Road in Norwich to attend the local premiere, thus giving Norwich its first ever Royal Premiere.

EMI sold this and Tales of Beatrix Potter to China for release at $16,000 each. They were the first western films to be released in China for two decades.

The inaugural screening of a brand new restoration of the film released by StudioCanal UK took place at Cinema City, Norwich, on 11 September 2019.

Box office
By August 1971 Nat Cohen stated the film had already been "contracted" for a million dollars. The film was one of the most popular movies of 1972 at the British box office. By September 1972 James Aubrey of MGM said the film lost Columbia $200,000 and he insisted that selling the film had been the right move. In 1973 Losey said the film was still not in profit.

According to a biography of Losey, after eighteen months of release the net takings in the UK were £232,249. At 1 July 1972 Columbia's territories had earned $2,198,382 including $1,581,972 in the US and Canada. Ten years after its premiere the film had earned £290,888 from UK cinemas and TV, £204,566 from overseas sales (excluding the US), £96,599 from the British Film Fund, and Columbia's gross receipts in the US, Canada and France were £1,375,300. Losey's personal percentage of film's box office was £39,355. So the film was, in the end, quite profitable.

Critical reception
Charles Champlin in the Los Angeles Times wrote after the US premiere in November 1971 that The Go-Between was one of the best films of the previous six years. Andrew Sarris in the Village Voice labelled it the best film of the year. Writing in 1985, Joanne Klein saw the filmscript "as a major stylistic and technical advance in Pinter’s work for the screen", and Foster Hirsch described it as "one of the world’s great films" in 1980. In 2009, Emanuel Levy called the film "Losey's Masterpiece".

Accolades
For many involved it was praised as the peak of their careers. Leighton earned her only Academy Award nomination as Best Supporting Actress for her performance in the film. In 1999, it was included on the British Film Institute's list of its 100 best British films.

See also

 BFI Top 100 British films
 1971 in film
 List of British films of 1971

Notes

Further reading

 Billington, Michael (2007). Harold Pinter.  2nd ed. London: Faber and Faber.  .  [Updated edition of The Life and Work of Harold Pinter (London: Faber, 1996).]

 Forbes, Bryan (1993). A Divided Life Memoirs. Mandarin Publishing.  .
 Gale, Steven H. (2003). Sharp Cut Harold Pinter's Screenplays and the Artistic Process.  Lexington, Kentucky: University Press of Kentucky.  .
 Gale, Steven H. (editor; 2001). The Films of Harold Pinter.  Albany, New York: State University of New York Press.  .
 Hartop, Christopher (2011). Norfolk Summer: Making The Go-Between.  Cambridge: John Adamson. .

External links
 
 
 
 HaroldPinter.org: Films by Harold Pinter - The Go Between

1971 films
1971 romantic drama films
British romantic drama films
1970s English-language films
Films about couples
Films about families
Films about social class
Films about suicide
Films based on British novels
Films directed by Joseph Losey
Films scored by Michel Legrand
Films set in 1900
Films set in country houses
Films set in Norfolk
Films set in the 1950s
Films shot at EMI-Elstree Studios
Films shot in Norfolk
Films whose writer won the Best Screenplay BAFTA Award
Palme d'Or winners
Films with screenplays by Harold Pinter
EMI Films films
1970s British films